The Pamaria are a Muslim community found in the state of Bihar in India.

References 

Dom people
Dom in India
Social groups of Bihar
Muslim communities of India
Muslim communities of Bihar
Dalit Muslim
Romani in India